Clarkenia miramundi is a species of moth of the family Tortricidae. It is found in El Salvador.

References

Moths described in 1988
Euliini
Moths of Central America
Taxa named by Józef Razowski